DuQuoin Community Unit School District 300 is a school district headquartered in DuQuoin, Illinois. In addition it serves St. Johns and Sunfield.

Schools
 DuQuoin High School
 DuQuoin Middle School
 DuQuoin Elementary School

Built in 1999, the K-8 school building has  of space.

References

External links
 
Education in Perry County, Illinois
School districts in Illinois